Varvara Matveevna Baruzdina (1862, Krasny Kholm – 1941, Saint Petersburg) was a Russian Realist painter, primarily of genre scenes.

Biography

Her father was a village craftsman. In 1875, she moved to Saint Petersburg to live with her uncle, the painter Pavel Chistyakov, who provided her first drawing lessons. Five years later, she entered the Imperial Academy of Arts where she became his formal student. While there, she was awarded a silver medal and graduated in 1885.
 
She began participating in exhibitions after 1888; notably those of the Academy (until 1916), the Female Art Circle (1889) and the Moscow Art Lovers Society (1895-1896). Her painting, "The Nun", was acquired by Pavel Tretyakov in 1896. One of her works, "Separated" was shown at the Louisiana Purchase Exposition in 1904. Along with numerous other Russian paintings it was "lost" there and not recovered for many years.

In the 1920s, after spending some time in Crimea, she moved into Chistyakov's house in the Pushkin District, where she wrote memoirs of his life and attracted a circle of students who wanted to be taught by his methods.

She was killed by German soldiers, during the early part of the Siege of Leningrad, while trying to prevent them from looting her home. Friends buried her in the garden. The memoirs were published in 1953. Her paintings may be found in the Tretyakov Gallery and the Russian Museum.

References

External links

"Separated and ‘lost’ for 103 years"  @ Articles & Texticles

1862 births
1941 deaths
People from Tver Oblast
Russian women painters
19th-century painters from the Russian Empire
20th-century Russian painters
20th-century Russian women artists
19th-century women artists from the Russian Empire
Victims of the Siege of Leningrad
Russian people executed by Nazi Germany